Honami may refer to:

Honami (name)
Honami, Fukuoka, a former town in Kaho District, Fukuoka Prefecture, Japan
25074 Honami, a minor planet
Sony Xperia Z1, development codename Honami